This is a list of German television related events from 1998.

Events
5 January - British children's television series Thomas the Tank Engine & Friends begins airing on German television for the first time ever after only being released on home video since 1995. The series will begin airing on RTL II.
27 February - Guildo Horn is selected to represent Germany at the 1998 Eurovision Song Contest with his song "Guildo hat euch lieb!". He is selected to be the forty-third German Eurovision entry during Countdown Grand Prix held at the Stadthalle in Bremen.

Debuts

Free for air

Domestic
13 January -  (1998) (Sat.1)
21 April - Der Clown (1998–2001) (RTL)
4 September - Schloss Einstein (1998–present) (KiKA)
26 October - In aller Freundschaft (1998–present) (Das Erste)
20 November -  (1998) (Arte)

International
5 January -  Thomas the Tank Engine & Friends (1984–present) (RTL II)
28 March - / Beast Wars: Transformers (1996–1999) (RTL II)
14 April -  Extreme Dinosaurs (1997) (Super RTL)
23 June -  PB Bear and Friends (1998) (KiKA)
9 October -  Buffy the Vampire Slayer (1997–2003) (ProSieben)
28 November -  Moesha (1996–2001) (RTL)
10 December -  The Adventures of Spot (1987–1993) (KiKA)
21 December - / Animal Crackers (1997–1999) (KiKA)
24 December -  Percy the Park Keeper (1996–1999) (Das Erste)

Cable

International
2 May -  The Angry Beavers (1997-2001) (Nickelodeon)

American Forces Network
 Bananas in Pajamas (1992-2001)
 The Journey of Allen Strange (1997-2000)

BFBS
31 March -  The Wombles (1998-2001)
12 August -  Whizziwig (1998-2000)
29 November -  Dinnerladies (1998-2000)
/ Archibald the Koala (1998-2000)
 Animal Stories (1998-2002)

Television shows

1950s
Tagesschau (1952-present)

1960s
 heute (1963-present)

1970s
 heute-journal (1978-present)
 Tagesthemen (1978-present)

1980s
Wetten, dass..? (1981-2014)
Lindenstraße (1985-present)

1990s
Gute Zeiten, schlechte Zeiten (1992-present)
Marienhof (1992-2011)
Unter uns (1994-present)
Verbotene Liebe (1995-2015)

Ending this year

Births

Deaths

See also 
1998 in Germany